This is a partial list of unnumbered minor planets for principal provisional designations assigned between 1 January and 15 March 2001. , a total of 276 bodies remain unnumbered for this period. Objects for this year are listed on the following pages: A–E · Fi · Fii · G–O · P–R · S · T · U · V–W and X–Y. Also see previous and next year.

A 

|- id="2001 AQ1" bgcolor=#FA8072
| 9 ||  || MCA || 17.99 || 1.1 km || single || 1 day || 03 Jan 2001 || 14 || align=left | Disc.: LINEARAdded on 21 August 2021 || 
|- id="2001 AT1" bgcolor=#FA8072
| 1 ||  || MCA || 19.14 || data-sort-value="0.44" | 440 m || multiple || 2000–2021 || 26 Nov 2021 || 68 || align=left | Disc.: LINEAR || 
|- id="2001 AA6" bgcolor=#d6d6d6
| 0 ||  || MBA-O || 15.65 || 4.1 km || multiple || 2001–2021 || 07 Nov 2021 || 77 || align=left | Disc.: LINEAR || 
|- id="2001 AP19" bgcolor=#fefefe
| 0 ||  || MBA-I || 18.4 || data-sort-value="0.62" | 620 m || multiple || 1998–2021 || 18 Jan 2021 || 78 || align=left | Disc.: Bohyunsan Obs. || 
|- id="2001 AS19" bgcolor=#d6d6d6
| 0 ||  || MBA-O || 17.49 || 1.8 km || multiple || 2001–2022 || 27 Jan 2022 || 74 || align=left | Disc.: Bohyunsan Obs. || 
|- id="2001 AV43" bgcolor=#FFC2E0
| 1 ||  || APO || 24.6 || data-sort-value="0.043" | 43 m || multiple || 2000–2013 || 28 Oct 2013 || 101 || align=left | Disc.: LINEAR || 
|- id="2001 AU49" bgcolor=#d6d6d6
| 0 ||  || MBA-O || 15.5 || 4.4 km || multiple || 1995–2020 || 21 Apr 2020 || 148 || align=left | Disc.: SpacewatchAlt.: 2011 QB94 || 
|- id="2001 AM54" bgcolor=#d6d6d6
| 0 ||  || MBA-O || 16.2 || 3.2 km || multiple || 2001–2020 || 13 May 2020 || 53 || align=left | Disc.: Spacewatch || 
|- id="2001 AO54" bgcolor=#C2FFFF
| 0 ||  || JT || 14.08 || 8.5 km || multiple || 2001–2021 || 10 Dec 2021 || 143 || align=left | Disc.: SpacewatchGreek camp (L4) || 
|- id="2001 AP54" bgcolor=#d6d6d6
| 0 ||  || MBA-O || 16.4 || 2.9 km || multiple || 2001–2020 || 14 Aug 2020 || 50 || align=left | Disc.: Spacewatch || 
|- id="2001 AS54" bgcolor=#fefefe
| 0 ||  || MBA-I || 18.2 || data-sort-value="0.68" | 680 m || multiple || 2001–2020 || 24 Jan 2020 || 39 || align=left | Disc.: Spacewatch || 
|}
back to top

B 

|- id="2001 BF10" bgcolor=#FFC2E0
| 1 ||  || APO || 22.6 || data-sort-value="0.11" | 110 m || multiple || 2001–2002 || 31 Dec 2002 || 35 || align=left | Disc.: LINEAR || 
|- id="2001 BX15" bgcolor=#FFC2E0
| 2 ||  || APO || 21.6 || data-sort-value="0.17" | 170 m || multiple || 2001–2017 || 28 Jan 2017 || 103 || align=left | Disc.: LINEAR || 
|- id="2001 BY15" bgcolor=#FFC2E0
| 0 ||  || AMO || 19.1 || data-sort-value="0.54" | 540 m || multiple || 2000–2014 || 19 Mar 2014 || 150 || align=left | Disc.: LONEOS || 
|- id="2001 BA16" bgcolor=#FFC2E0
| 6 ||  || ATE || 26.0 || data-sort-value="0.022" | 22 m || single || 40 days || 28 Feb 2001 || 20 || align=left | Disc.: LINEAR || 
|- id="2001 BB16" bgcolor=#FFC2E0
| 1 ||  || ATE || 23.2 || data-sort-value="0.081" | 81 m || multiple || 2001–2020 || 17 Feb 2020 || 56 || align=left | Disc.: LINEAR || 
|- id="2001 BC16" bgcolor=#FFC2E0
| 5 ||  || APO || 23.9 || data-sort-value="0.059" | 59 m || single || 62 days || 23 Mar 2001 || 34 || align=left | Disc.: LINEAR || 
|- id="2001 BD16" bgcolor=#FFC2E0
| 1 ||  || APO || 19.97 || data-sort-value="0.36" | 360 m || multiple || 1999–2021 || 24 Apr 2021 || 26 || align=left | Disc.: LINEAR || 
|- id="2001 BE16" bgcolor=#FFC2E0
| 1 ||  || APO || 19.89 || data-sort-value="0.37" | 370 m || multiple || 2001–2022 || 13 Jan 2022 || 56 || align=left | Disc.: LINEAR || 
|- id="2001 BD36" bgcolor=#E9E9E9
| 0 ||  || MBA-M || 17.1 || 1.1 km || multiple || 2001–2021 || 09 Jan 2021 || 94 || align=left | Disc.: LINEAR || 
|- id="2001 BB40" bgcolor=#FFC2E0
| 8 ||  || APO || 24.6 || data-sort-value="0.043" | 43 m || single || 2 days || 26 Jan 2001 || 11 || align=left | Disc.: SpacewatchAMO at MPC || 
|- id="2001 BB52" bgcolor=#fefefe
| 0 ||  || MBA-I || 18.64 || data-sort-value="0.56" | 560 m || multiple || 2001–2021 || 07 Apr 2021 || 87 || align=left | Disc.: Spacewatch || 
|- id="2001 BO60" bgcolor=#FFC2E0
| 2 ||  || AMO || 19.3 || data-sort-value="0.49" | 490 m || multiple || 2001–2002 || 27 Dec 2002 || 39 || align=left | Disc.: LINEAR || 
|- id="2001 BM61" bgcolor=#FFC2E0
| – ||  || AMO || 21.0 || data-sort-value="0.22" | 220 m || single || 1 day || 20 Jan 2001 || 9 || align=left | Disc.: LINEAR || 
|- id="2001 BN61" bgcolor=#FFC2E0
| 7 ||  || APO || 25.0 || data-sort-value="0.036" | 36 m || single || 2 days || 21 Jan 2001 || 8 || align=left | Disc.: LINEAR || 
|- id="2001 BP61" bgcolor=#FFC2E0
| 1 ||  || APO || 20.2 || data-sort-value="0.32" | 320 m || multiple || 2001–2021 || 15 Jan 2021 || 79 || align=left | Disc.: LINEARAMO at MPC || 
|- id="2001 BW64" bgcolor=#E9E9E9
| 0 ||  || MBA-M || 16.7 || 1.4 km || multiple || 2001–2021 || 18 Jan 2021 || 133 || align=left | Disc.: AMOSAlt.: 2013 AZ67 || 
|- id="2001 BH70" bgcolor=#d6d6d6
| 0 ||  || MBA-O || 16.0 || 3.5 km || multiple || 2001–2020 || 13 Oct 2020 || 69 || align=left | Disc.: Spacewatch || 
|- id="2001 BV70" bgcolor=#d6d6d6
| – ||  || MBA-O || 14.7 || 6.4 km || single || 50 days || 20 Mar 2001 || 32 || align=left | Disc.: LINEAR || 
|- id="2001 BX79" bgcolor=#d6d6d6
| 0 ||  || MBA-O || 16.3 || 3.1 km || multiple || 2001–2021 || 04 Jan 2021 || 49 || align=left | Disc.: LINEAR || 
|- id="2001 BQ82" bgcolor=#d6d6d6
| E ||  || MBA-O || 16.3 || 3.1 km || single || 2 days || 27 Jan 2001 || 9 || align=left | Disc.: Mauna Kea Obs. || 
|- id="2001 BM83" bgcolor=#d6d6d6
| 0 ||  || MBA-O || 16.97 || 2.2 km || multiple || 2001–2021 || 30 Jul 2021 || 36 || align=left | Disc.: SDSSAdded on 22 July 2020Alt.: 2005 VL12 || 
|- id="2001 BR83" bgcolor=#d6d6d6
| 0 ||  || MBA-O || 16.59 || 2.7 km || multiple || 2001–2021 || 31 Oct 2021 || 132 || align=left | Disc.: SDSS || 
|- id="2001 BU83" bgcolor=#fefefe
| 0 ||  || MBA-I || 17.7 || data-sort-value="0.86" | 860 m || multiple || 2001–2020 || 23 Mar 2020 || 123 || align=left | Disc.: Spacewatch || 
|- id="2001 BW83" bgcolor=#d6d6d6
| 0 ||  || MBA-O || 16.3 || 3.1 km || multiple || 2001–2020 || 15 Dec 2020 || 136 || align=left | Disc.: SDSS || 
|- id="2001 BZ83" bgcolor=#E9E9E9
| 0 ||  || MBA-M || 17.66 || 1.6 km || multiple || 2001–2021 || 04 Jul 2021 || 62 || align=left | Disc.: Spacewatch || 
|- id="2001 BA84" bgcolor=#fefefe
| 0 ||  || MBA-I || 18.04 || data-sort-value="0.73" | 730 m || multiple || 2001–2021 || 01 Dec 2021 || 62 || align=left | Disc.: SDSS || 
|- id="2001 BE84" bgcolor=#E9E9E9
| 0 ||  || MBA-M || 17.1 || 1.6 km || multiple || 2001–2020 || 16 Oct 2020 || 102 || align=left | Disc.: Spacewatch || 
|- id="2001 BF84" bgcolor=#fefefe
| 1 ||  || MBA-I || 18.1 || data-sort-value="0.71" | 710 m || multiple || 2001–2020 || 22 Mar 2020 || 108 || align=left | Disc.: Spacewatch || 
|- id="2001 BG84" bgcolor=#fefefe
| 0 ||  || MBA-I || 18.3 || data-sort-value="0.65" | 650 m || multiple || 2001–2021 || 03 Apr 2021 || 83 || align=left | Disc.: SDSS || 
|- id="2001 BK84" bgcolor=#fefefe
| 0 ||  || MBA-I || 18.66 || data-sort-value="0.55" | 550 m || multiple || 2001–2021 || 13 Sep 2021 || 45 || align=left | Disc.: Spacewatch || 
|- id="2001 BL84" bgcolor=#fefefe
| 0 ||  || MBA-I || 18.31 || data-sort-value="0.65" | 650 m || multiple || 2001–2021 || 03 May 2021 || 147 || align=left | Disc.: Spacewatch || 
|- id="2001 BM84" bgcolor=#E9E9E9
| 0 ||  || MBA-M || 16.77 || 1.3 km || multiple || 2001–2022 || 14 Jan 2022 || 105 || align=left | Disc.: Spacewatch || 
|- id="2001 BO84" bgcolor=#fefefe
| 0 ||  || MBA-I || 18.33 || data-sort-value="0.64" | 640 m || multiple || 2001–2021 || 13 Oct 2021 || 85 || align=left | Disc.: Spacewatch || 
|- id="2001 BS84" bgcolor=#fefefe
| 0 ||  || HUN || 18.6 || data-sort-value="0.57" | 570 m || multiple || 2001–2020 || 24 Jan 2020 || 54 || align=left | Disc.: SDSS || 
|- id="2001 BT84" bgcolor=#fefefe
| 0 ||  || MBA-I || 18.20 || data-sort-value="0.68" | 680 m || multiple || 2001–2021 || 09 Sep 2021 || 46 || align=left | Disc.: Cerro Tololo || 
|- id="2001 BU84" bgcolor=#fefefe
| 0 ||  || HUN || 18.66 || data-sort-value="0.55" | 550 m || multiple || 1997–2021 || 12 Dec 2021 || 98 || align=left | Disc.: SDSS || 
|- id="2001 BV84" bgcolor=#fefefe
| 0 ||  || HUN || 18.75 || data-sort-value="0.53" | 530 m || multiple || 2001–2022 || 17 Jan 2022 || 40 || align=left | Disc.: SDSS || 
|- id="2001 BW84" bgcolor=#d6d6d6
| 0 ||  || MBA-O || 16.69 || 2.6 km || multiple || 2001–2021 || 27 Nov 2021 || 78 || align=left | Disc.: SDSS || 
|- id="2001 BB85" bgcolor=#E9E9E9
| 0 ||  || MBA-M || 17.59 || 1.3 km || multiple || 2001–2022 || 23 Jan 2022 || 41 || align=left | Disc.: SDSS || 
|- id="2001 BD85" bgcolor=#fefefe
| 0 ||  || MBA-I || 18.10 || data-sort-value="0.71" | 710 m || multiple || 2001–2021 || 03 Aug 2021 || 49 || align=left | Disc.: Spacewatch || 
|- id="2001 BE85" bgcolor=#E9E9E9
| 0 ||  || MBA-M || 18.68 || data-sort-value="0.77" | 770 m || multiple || 2001–2021 || 08 Nov 2021 || 36 || align=left | Disc.: SpacewatchAdded on 24 December 2021 || 
|}
back to top

C 

|- id="2001 CM" bgcolor=#FA8072
| 2 || 2001 CM || MCA || 19.56 || data-sort-value="0.47" | 470 m || multiple || 2001-2022 || 26 Dec 2022 || 51 || align=left | Disc.: LONEOS || 
|- id="2001 CA21" bgcolor=#FFC2E0
| – ||  || APO || 18.6 || data-sort-value="0.68" | 680 m || single || 2 days || 04 Feb 2001 || 13 || align=left | Disc.: LINEAR || 
|- id="2001 CP36" bgcolor=#FFC2E0
| 2 ||  || ATE || 23.7 || data-sort-value="0.065" | 65 m || multiple || 2001–2007 || 09 Mar 2007 || 137 || align=left | Disc.: LINEAR || 
|- id="2001 CQ36" bgcolor=#FFC2E0
| 0 ||  || ATE || 22.74 || data-sort-value="0.11" | 100 m || multiple || 2001–2022 || 05 May 2022 || 149 || align=left | Disc.: LINEAR || 
|- id="2001 CZ49" bgcolor=#d6d6d6
| 0 ||  || MBA-O || 17.00 || 2.2 km || multiple || 2001–2022 || 27 Jan 2022 || 88 || align=left | Disc.: Spacewatch || 
|- id="2001 CE50" bgcolor=#d6d6d6
| 0 ||  || MBA-O || 16.38 || 2.9 km || multiple || 2001–2021 || 07 Nov 2021 || 138 || align=left | Disc.: SpacewatchAlt.: 2010 NF29 || 
|- id="2001 CG50" bgcolor=#fefefe
| 0 ||  || MBA-I || 18.55 || data-sort-value="0.58" | 580 m || multiple || 2001–2021 || 06 Nov 2021 || 89 || align=left | Disc.: Spacewatch || 
|- id="2001 CL50" bgcolor=#E9E9E9
| 1 ||  || MBA-M || 17.3 || 1.0 km || multiple || 2001–2021 || 15 Jan 2021 || 124 || align=left | Disc.: Spacewatch || 
|- id="2001 CM50" bgcolor=#fefefe
| 0 ||  || MBA-I || 17.97 || data-sort-value="0.76" | 760 m || multiple || 1997–2021 || 10 May 2021 || 80 || align=left | Disc.: Spacewatch || 
|- id="2001 CN50" bgcolor=#d6d6d6
| 0 ||  || MBA-O || 17.00 || 2.2 km || multiple || 2001–2021 || 31 Aug 2021 || 55 || align=left | Disc.: Spacewatch || 
|- id="2001 CP50" bgcolor=#d6d6d6
| 0 ||  || MBA-O || 15.8 || 3.9 km || multiple || 2001–2021 || 01 Oct 2021 || 107 || align=left | Disc.: SpacewatchAlt.: 2010 MD57 || 
|- id="2001 CS50" bgcolor=#d6d6d6
| 0 ||  || MBA-O || 17.0 || 2.2 km || multiple || 2001–2020 || 25 Oct 2020 || 45 || align=left | Disc.: Spacewatch || 
|- id="2001 CT50" bgcolor=#E9E9E9
| 2 ||  || MBA-M || 17.9 || data-sort-value="0.78" | 780 m || multiple || 2001–2020 || 12 Dec 2020 || 118 || align=left | Disc.: Spacewatch || 
|- id="2001 CU50" bgcolor=#E9E9E9
| 0 ||  || MBA-M || 18.78 || data-sort-value="0.74" | 740 m || multiple || 2001–2021 || 28 Nov 2021 || 42 || align=left | Disc.: Spacewatch || 
|- id="2001 CV50" bgcolor=#fefefe
| 0 ||  || MBA-I || 18.5 || data-sort-value="0.59" | 590 m || multiple || 2001–2019 || 03 Apr 2019 || 81 || align=left | Disc.: Spacewatch || 
|- id="2001 CW50" bgcolor=#fefefe
| 0 ||  || MBA-I || 18.4 || data-sort-value="0.62" | 620 m || multiple || 2001–2021 || 18 Jan 2021 || 85 || align=left | Disc.: Ondřejov Obs. || 
|- id="2001 CX50" bgcolor=#fefefe
| 0 ||  || MBA-I || 18.3 || data-sort-value="0.65" | 650 m || multiple || 2001–2021 || 09 Jan 2021 || 67 || align=left | Disc.: Spacewatch || 
|- id="2001 CY50" bgcolor=#E9E9E9
| 0 ||  || MBA-M || 17.84 || 1.5 km || multiple || 2001–2021 || 03 Oct 2021 || 42 || align=left | Disc.: Spacewatch || 
|- id="2001 CZ50" bgcolor=#fefefe
| 1 ||  || MBA-I || 18.7 || data-sort-value="0.54" | 540 m || multiple || 2001–2019 || 08 Feb 2019 || 35 || align=left | Disc.: Spacewatch || 
|- id="2001 CA51" bgcolor=#E9E9E9
| 0 ||  || MBA-M || 16.8 || 1.3 km || multiple || 2001–2021 || 17 Jan 2021 || 75 || align=left | Disc.: Spacewatch || 
|- id="2001 CE51" bgcolor=#d6d6d6
| 0 ||  || MBA-O || 16.7 || 2.5 km || multiple || 2001–2019 || 07 Jun 2019 || 37 || align=left | Disc.: SpacewatchAdded on 24 December 2021 || 
|}
back to top

D 

|- id="2001 DL1" bgcolor=#d6d6d6
| 0 ||  || MBA-O || 16.72 || 2.5 km || multiple || 1998–2022 || 27 Jan 2022 || 99 || align=left | Disc.: Spacewatch || 
|- id="2001 DX1" bgcolor=#E9E9E9
| 0 ||  || MBA-M || 17.99 || 1.1 km || multiple || 2001–2021 || 30 Dec 2021 || 54 || align=left | Disc.: Spacewatch || 
|- id="2001 DS8" bgcolor=#FFC2E0
| 1 ||  || AMO || 22.6 || data-sort-value="0.11" | 110 m || single || 60 days || 18 Apr 2001 || 56 || align=left | Disc.: AMOS || 
|- id="2001 DT8" bgcolor=#FFC2E0
| 6 ||  || AMO || 19.5 || data-sort-value="0.45" | 450 m || single || 61 days || 19 Apr 2001 || 30 || align=left | Disc.: LINEAR || 
|- id="2001 DB11" bgcolor=#E9E9E9
| 0 ||  || MBA-M || 17.37 || 1.4 km || multiple || 2001–2022 || 27 Jan 2022 || 139 || align=left | Disc.: LINEARAlt.: 2008 VJ75, 2016 QD53 || 
|- id="2001 DG47" bgcolor=#FFC2E0
| 5 ||  || APO || 23.0 || data-sort-value="0.089" | 89 m || single || 58 days || 18 Apr 2001 || 27 || align=left | Disc.: LINEAR || 
|- id="2001 DV53" bgcolor=#E9E9E9
| 0 ||  || MBA-M || 17.4 || data-sort-value="0.98" | 980 m || multiple || 1995–2021 || 12 Jan 2021 || 116 || align=left | Disc.: SpacewatchAlt.: 2013 AO51, 2015 MQ104 || 
|- id="2001 DB56" bgcolor=#fefefe
| 1 ||  || MBA-I || 19.0 || data-sort-value="0.47" | 470 m || multiple || 2001–2020 || 19 May 2020 || 40 || align=left | Disc.: Spacewatch || 
|- id="2001 DZ76" bgcolor=#FFC2E0
| 6 ||  || APO || 25.3 || data-sort-value="0.031" | 31 m || single || 3 days || 23 Feb 2001 || 34 || align=left | Disc.: LINEAR || 
|- id="2001 DC77" bgcolor=#FFC2E0
| 2 ||  || AMO || 19.5 || data-sort-value="0.45" | 450 m || multiple || 2001–2005 || 09 Apr 2005 || 81 || align=left | Disc.: LINEAR || 
|- id="2001 DK77" bgcolor=#fefefe
| 0 ||  || MBA-I || 18.48 || data-sort-value="0.60" | 600 m || multiple || 2001–2021 || 03 Jul 2021 || 92 || align=left | Disc.: Spacewatch || 
|- id="2001 DP77" bgcolor=#d6d6d6
| 0 ||  || MBA-O || 17.01 || 2.2 km || multiple || 2001–2021 || 28 Nov 2021 || 46 || align=left | Disc.: SpacewatchAdded on 24 December 2021 || 
|- id="2001 DX79" bgcolor=#fefefe
| 0 ||  || MBA-I || 18.08 || data-sort-value="0.72" | 720 m || multiple || 2001–2021 || 27 Dec 2021 || 79 || align=left | Disc.: AMOS || 
|- id="2001 DP81" bgcolor=#FA8072
| 0 ||  || MCA || 19.38 || data-sort-value="0.40" | 400 m || multiple || 2001–2022 || 07 Jan 2022 || 204 || align=left | Disc.: La Palma Obs. || 
|- id="2001 DA82" bgcolor=#fefefe
| 0 ||  || MBA-I || 18.0 || data-sort-value="0.75" | 750 m || multiple || 1994–2020 || 23 Sep 2020 || 121 || align=left | Disc.: SpacewatchAlt.: 2008 AK121, 2010 WN24, 2012 FK76 || 
|- id="2001 DC83" bgcolor=#E9E9E9
| 1 ||  || MBA-M || 17.6 || data-sort-value="0.90" | 900 m || multiple || 2001–2021 || 17 Jan 2021 || 147 || align=left | Disc.: SpacewatchAlt.: 2009 CD61, 2017 BO64 || 
|- id="2001 DC84" bgcolor=#d6d6d6
| E ||  || MBA-O || 18.3 || 1.2 km || single || 2 days || 25 Feb 2001 || 13 || align=left | Disc.: Cerro Tololo || 
|- id="2001 DF84" bgcolor=#fefefe
| E ||  || MBA-I || 19.1 || data-sort-value="0.45" | 450 m || single || 2 days || 25 Feb 2001 || 14 || align=left | Disc.: Cerro Tololo || 
|- id="2001 DH84" bgcolor=#E9E9E9
| 0 ||  || MBA-M || 16.9 || 1.8 km || multiple || 2001–2020 || 19 Dec 2020 || 111 || align=left | Disc.: Cerro TololoAlt.: 2011 US380 || 
|- id="2001 DM84" bgcolor=#d6d6d6
| 0 ||  || MBA-O || 17.4 || 1.8 km || multiple || 2001–2021 || 18 Feb 2021 || 44 || align=left | Disc.: Cerro Tololo || 
|- id="2001 DO84" bgcolor=#E9E9E9
| 2 ||  || MBA-M || 18.3 || data-sort-value="0.92" | 920 m || multiple || 2001–2019 || 01 Nov 2019 || 36 || align=left | Disc.: Cerro Tololo || 
|- id="2001 DR84" bgcolor=#E9E9E9
| 2 ||  || MBA-M || 18.2 || 1.3 km || multiple || 2001–2019 || 02 Jun 2019 || 30 || align=left | Disc.: Cerro TololoAlt.: 2014 ES178 || 
|- id="2001 DW84" bgcolor=#fefefe
| E ||  || MBA-I || 19.9 || data-sort-value="0.31" | 310 m || single || 2 days || 25 Feb 2001 || 14 || align=left | Disc.: Cerro Tololo || 
|- id="2001 DB85" bgcolor=#E9E9E9
| 3 ||  || MBA-M || 19.26 || data-sort-value="0.78" | 780 m || multiple || 2001–2019 || 07 May 2019 || 31 || align=left | Disc.: Cerro Tololo || 
|- id="2001 DD85" bgcolor=#d6d6d6
| 0 ||  || MBA-O || 17.3 || 1.9 km || multiple || 2001–2019 || 27 Oct 2019 || 65 || align=left | Disc.: Cerro Tololo || 
|- id="2001 DN85" bgcolor=#d6d6d6
| 0 ||  || MBA-O || 17.25 || 2.0 km || multiple || 2001–2019 || 01 Jul 2019 || 51 || align=left | Disc.: Cerro TololoAdded on 17 June 2021Alt.: 2014 SW234 || 
|- id="2001 DR85" bgcolor=#fefefe
| 0 ||  || MBA-I || 18.3 || data-sort-value="0.65" | 650 m || multiple || 2001–2020 || 16 Oct 2020 || 58 || align=left | Disc.: Cerro TololoAdded on 17 January 2021 || 
|- id="2001 DT85" bgcolor=#fefefe
| 0 ||  || MBA-I || 19.17 || data-sort-value="0.44" | 440 m || multiple || 2001–2020 || 16 Oct 2020 || 30 || align=left | Disc.: Cerro Tololo || 
|- id="2001 DW85" bgcolor=#E9E9E9
| 0 ||  || MBA-M || 18.01 || 1.4 km || multiple || 2001–2021 || 11 Oct 2021 || 51 || align=left | Disc.: Cerro Tololo || 
|- id="2001 DA86" bgcolor=#d6d6d6
| – ||  || MBA-O || 19.2 || data-sort-value="0.80" | 800 m || single || 23 days || 20 Mar 2001 || 12 || align=left | Disc.: Cerro Tololo || 
|- id="2001 DC86" bgcolor=#fefefe
| 0 ||  || MBA-I || 17.9 || data-sort-value="0.78" | 780 m || multiple || 2001–2020 || 14 Dec 2020 || 117 || align=left | Disc.: Cerro TololoAlt.: 2005 MZ30, 2006 VL142, 2015 FN88 || 
|- id="2001 DD86" bgcolor=#d6d6d6
| 3 ||  || MBA-O || 17.9 || 1.5 km || multiple || 2001–2020 || 10 Dec 2020 || 19 || align=left | Disc.: Cerro TololoAdded on 9 March 2021 || 
|- id="2001 DF86" bgcolor=#d6d6d6
| 0 ||  || MBA-O || 16.80 || 2.4 km || multiple || 2001–2021 || 07 Nov 2021 || 86 || align=left | Disc.: Cerro Tololo || 
|- id="2001 DG86" bgcolor=#fefefe
| 0 ||  || MBA-I || 18.22 || data-sort-value="0.67" | 670 m || multiple || 2001–2021 || 04 Oct 2021 || 60 || align=left | Disc.: Cerro TololoAdded on 30 September 2021Alt.: 2021 MN16 || 
|- id="2001 DS86" bgcolor=#fefefe
| 0 ||  || MBA-I || 18.01 || data-sort-value="0.74" | 740 m || multiple || 2001–2022 || 06 Jan 2022 || 166 || align=left | Disc.: Piszkéstető Stn. || 
|- id="2001 DP88" bgcolor=#d6d6d6
| 2 ||  || MBA-O || 17.8 || 1.5 km || multiple || 2001–2021 || 18 Jan 2021 || 71 || align=left | Disc.: SpacewatchAlt.: 2011 BO90, 2016 CB20 || 
|- id="2001 DL95" bgcolor=#fefefe
| 0 ||  || HUN || 18.32 || data-sort-value="0.64" | 640 m || multiple || 2001–2021 || 29 Sep 2021 || 187 || align=left | Disc.: AMOSAlt.: 2015 FQ374 || 
|- id="2001 DP96" bgcolor=#fefefe
| 0 ||  || MBA-I || 18.7 || data-sort-value="0.54" | 540 m || multiple || 2001–2020 || 13 Sep 2020 || 34 || align=left | Disc.: Spacewatch || 
|- id="2001 DB106" bgcolor=#C2E0FF
| 3 ||  || TNO || 6.5 || 167 km || multiple || 2001–2015 || 15 Apr 2015 || 21 || align=left | Disc.: La Silla Obs.LoUTNOs, cubewano (cold) || 
|- id="2001 DC106" bgcolor=#C2E0FF
| 2 ||  || TNO || 6.4 || 174 km || multiple || 2001–2020 || 31 Jan 2020 || 63 || align=left | Disc.: La Silla Obs.LoUTNOs, cubewano (cold) || 
|- id="2001 DD106" bgcolor=#C2E0FF
| 3 ||  || TNO || 7.3 || 115 km || multiple || 2001–2020 || 28 Feb 2020 || 25 || align=left | Disc.: La Silla Obs.LoUTNOs, cubewano (cold) || 
|- id="2001 DR106" bgcolor=#C2E0FF
| E ||  || TNO || 8.3 || 75 km || single || 3 days || 25 Feb 2001 || 6 || align=left | Disc.: Mauna Kea Obs.LoUTNOs, cubewano? || 
|- id="2001 DS106" bgcolor=#C2E0FF
| E ||  || TNO || 8.3 || 75 km || single || 3 days || 25 Feb 2001 || 6 || align=left | Disc.: Mauna Kea Obs.LoUTNOs, cubewano? || 
|- id="2001 DM108" bgcolor=#C2E0FF
| E ||  || TNO || 7.3 || 119 km || single || 3 days || 25 Feb 2001 || 10 || align=left | Disc.: Mauna Kea Obs.LoUTNOs, cubewano? || 
|- id="2001 DN108" bgcolor=#C2E0FF
| E ||  || TNO || 7.8 || 95 km || single || 3 days || 25 Feb 2001 || 6 || align=left | Disc.: Mauna Kea Obs.LoUTNOs, cubewano? || 
|- id="2001 DO108" bgcolor=#C2E0FF
| E ||  || TNO || 8.4 || 72 km || single || 3 days || 25 Feb 2001 || 13 || align=left | Disc.: Mauna Kea Obs.LoUTNOs, cubewano? || 
|- id="2001 DP108" bgcolor=#C2E0FF
| E ||  || TNO || 10.0 || 47 km || single || 3 days || 25 Feb 2001 || 10 || align=left | Disc.: Mauna Kea Obs.LoUTNOs, plutino? || 
|- id="2001 DQ108" bgcolor=#C2E0FF
| E ||  || TNO || 8.6 || 65 km || single || 3 days || 25 Feb 2001 || 18 || align=left | Disc.: Mauna Kea Obs.LoUTNOs, cubewano? || 
|- id="2001 DS108" bgcolor=#C2E0FF
| E ||  || TNO || 8.0 || 86 km || single || 3 days || 25 Feb 2001 || 6 || align=left | Disc.: Mauna Kea Obs.LoUTNOs, cubewano? || 
|- id="2001 DT108" bgcolor=#C2E0FF
| E ||  || TNO || 9.5 || 60 km || single || 3 days || 25 Feb 2001 || 6 || align=left | Disc.: Mauna Kea Obs.LoUTNOs, plutino? || 
|- id="2001 DU108" bgcolor=#C2E0FF
| E ||  || TNO || 8.5 || 68 km || single || 3 days || 25 Feb 2001 || 4 || align=left | Disc.: Mauna Kea Obs.LoUTNOs, cubewano? || 
|- id="2001 DV108" bgcolor=#C2E0FF
| 6 ||  || TNO || 8.2 || 95 km || multiple || 2001–2002 || 08 Apr 2002 || 15 || align=left | Disc.: Mauna Kea Obs.LoUTNOs, other TNO || 
|- id="2001 DX109" bgcolor=#fefefe
| 0 ||  || HUN || 18.04 || data-sort-value="0.73" | 730 m || multiple || 2001–2021 || 01 Sep 2021 || 97 || align=left | Disc.: SDSS || 
|- id="2001 DY109" bgcolor=#d6d6d6
| 0 ||  || MBA-O || 16.65 || 2.6 km || multiple || 2001–2021 || 06 Dec 2021 || 75 || align=left | Disc.: SDSSAdded on 24 August 2020 || 
|- id="2001 DJ110" bgcolor=#E9E9E9
| 0 ||  || MBA-M || 17.89 || 1.1 km || multiple || 2001–2021 || 13 Nov 2021 || 38 || align=left | Disc.: SDSS || 
|- id="2001 DY110" bgcolor=#d6d6d6
| 0 ||  || MBA-O || 16.82 || 4.7 km || multiple || 2001–2021 || 10 May 2021 || 91 || align=left | Disc.: La Palma Obs.Alt.: 2010 LS59 || 
|- id="2001 DE111" bgcolor=#E9E9E9
| 0 ||  || MBA-M || 16.8 || 2.4 km || multiple || 2001–2020 || 11 May 2020 || 57 || align=left | Disc.: SDSSAlt.: 2015 DC85, 2017 SW105 || 
|- id="2001 DH111" bgcolor=#E9E9E9
| 0 ||  || MBA-M || 16.98 || 2.2 km || multiple || 2001–2021 || 23 May 2021 || 101 || align=left | Disc.: SDSSAlt.: 2015 ES11 || 
|- id="2001 DW111" bgcolor=#E9E9E9
| 0 ||  || MBA-M || 17.23 || 2.0 km || multiple || 1999–2021 || 29 Oct 2021 || 151 || align=left | Disc.: La Palma Obs.Alt.: 2001 CW46, 2006 FL14, 2015 HR17 || 
|- id="2001 DL112" bgcolor=#E9E9E9
| 0 ||  || MBA-M || 16.7 || 2.5 km || multiple || 2001–2020 || 17 May 2020 || 79 || align=left | Disc.: SDSS || 
|- id="2001 DO112" bgcolor=#d6d6d6
| 0 ||  || MBA-O || 16.6 || 2.7 km || multiple || 2001–2019 || 26 Nov 2019 || 93 || align=left | Disc.: SDSS || 
|- id="2001 DQ112" bgcolor=#E9E9E9
| 0 ||  || MBA-M || 17.43 || 1.8 km || multiple || 2001–2021 || 08 Sep 2021 || 108 || align=left | Disc.: ADAS || 
|- id="2001 DU112" bgcolor=#fefefe
| 0 ||  || MBA-I || 17.97 || data-sort-value="0.76" | 760 m || multiple || 2001–2022 || 25 Jan 2022 || 121 || align=left | Disc.: Spacewatch || 
|- id="2001 DV112" bgcolor=#d6d6d6
| 0 ||  || MBA-O || 15.97 || 3.6 km || multiple || 2001–2021 || 30 Jun 2021 || 90 || align=left | Disc.: SDSSAlt.: 2010 KK152 || 
|- id="2001 DZ112" bgcolor=#fefefe
| 0 ||  || MBA-I || 18.87 || data-sort-value="0.50" | 500 m || multiple || 2001–2021 || 06 Nov 2021 || 110 || align=left | Disc.: SDSS || 
|- id="2001 DA113" bgcolor=#fefefe
| 0 ||  || MBA-I || 18.0 || data-sort-value="0.75" | 750 m || multiple || 2001–2020 || 10 Dec 2020 || 65 || align=left | Disc.: Spacewatch || 
|- id="2001 DB113" bgcolor=#d6d6d6
| 0 ||  || MBA-O || 16.6 || 2.7 km || multiple || 2001–2020 || 10 Dec 2020 || 89 || align=left | Disc.: SDSS || 
|- id="2001 DG113" bgcolor=#E9E9E9
| 0 ||  || MBA-M || 18.02 || 1.0 km || multiple || 2001–2021 || 06 Oct 2021 || 81 || align=left | Disc.: SDSS || 
|- id="2001 DK113" bgcolor=#fefefe
| 0 ||  || MBA-I || 17.5 || data-sort-value="0.94" | 940 m || multiple || 2001–2020 || 14 Oct 2020 || 80 || align=left | Disc.: AMOS || 
|- id="2001 DL113" bgcolor=#E9E9E9
| 0 ||  || MBA-M || 17.48 || 1.3 km || multiple || 2001–2022 || 26 Jan 2022 || 121 || align=left | Disc.: Mauna Kea Obs. || 
|- id="2001 DM113" bgcolor=#d6d6d6
| 0 ||  || MBA-O || 16.73 || 2.5 km || multiple || 2001–2022 || 26 Jan 2022 || 81 || align=left | Disc.: SDSS || 
|- id="2001 DR113" bgcolor=#E9E9E9
| 0 ||  || MBA-M || 17.4 || 1.4 km || multiple || 2001–2020 || 15 Oct 2020 || 80 || align=left | Disc.: Spacewatch || 
|- id="2001 DS113" bgcolor=#C2FFFF
| 0 ||  || JT || 14.28 || 7.8 km || multiple || 2001–2021 || 25 Nov 2021 || 119 || align=left | Disc.: SpacewatchGreek camp (L4) || 
|- id="2001 DT113" bgcolor=#E9E9E9
| 0 ||  || MBA-M || 17.63 || 1.7 km || multiple || 2001–2021 || 08 Sep 2021 || 78 || align=left | Disc.: SDSS || 
|- id="2001 DU113" bgcolor=#E9E9E9
| 0 ||  || MBA-M || 17.61 || 1.7 km || multiple || 2001–2021 || 08 Sep 2021 || 71 || align=left | Disc.: SDSS || 
|- id="2001 DV113" bgcolor=#d6d6d6
| 0 ||  || MBA-O || 16.9 || 2.3 km || multiple || 2001–2019 || 08 Nov 2019 || 64 || align=left | Disc.: SDSS || 
|- id="2001 DW113" bgcolor=#E9E9E9
| 0 ||  || MBA-M || 17.8 || data-sort-value="0.82" | 820 m || multiple || 2001–2021 || 15 Jan 2021 || 108 || align=left | Disc.: Spacewatch || 
|- id="2001 DX113" bgcolor=#E9E9E9
| 0 ||  || MBA-M || 17.5 || data-sort-value="0.94" | 940 m || multiple || 2001–2021 || 03 Jan 2021 || 96 || align=left | Disc.: SDSS || 
|- id="2001 DZ113" bgcolor=#fefefe
| 0 ||  || MBA-I || 18.3 || data-sort-value="0.65" | 650 m || multiple || 2001–2020 || 17 Dec 2020 || 72 || align=left | Disc.: SDSS || 
|- id="2001 DB114" bgcolor=#E9E9E9
| 0 ||  || MBA-M || 17.7 || data-sort-value="0.86" | 860 m || multiple || 1995–2021 || 12 Jan 2021 || 58 || align=left | Disc.: SDSS || 
|- id="2001 DC114" bgcolor=#E9E9E9
| 0 ||  || MBA-M || 17.7 || 1.2 km || multiple || 2001–2020 || 17 Nov 2020 || 74 || align=left | Disc.: SDSS || 
|- id="2001 DD114" bgcolor=#d6d6d6
| 0 ||  || MBA-O || 16.73 || 2.5 km || multiple || 2001–2021 || 29 Aug 2021 || 64 || align=left | Disc.: SDSSAlt.: 2010 NY98 || 
|- id="2001 DE114" bgcolor=#d6d6d6
| 0 ||  || MBA-O || 17.06 || 2.2 km || multiple || 2001–2021 || 09 May 2021 || 96 || align=left | Disc.: SDSS || 
|- id="2001 DF114" bgcolor=#fefefe
| 0 ||  || MBA-I || 18.02 || data-sort-value="0.74" | 740 m || multiple || 2001–2021 || 23 Nov 2021 || 71 || align=left | Disc.: SDSS || 
|- id="2001 DG114" bgcolor=#E9E9E9
| 0 ||  || MBA-M || 17.3 || 1.0 km || multiple || 2001–2021 || 17 Jan 2021 || 117 || align=left | Disc.: SDSS || 
|- id="2001 DJ114" bgcolor=#fefefe
| 0 ||  || MBA-I || 18.1 || data-sort-value="0.71" | 710 m || multiple || 2001–2021 || 17 Jan 2021 || 89 || align=left | Disc.: SDSS || 
|- id="2001 DK114" bgcolor=#fefefe
| 0 ||  || MBA-I || 18.61 || data-sort-value="0.56" | 560 m || multiple || 2001–2020 || 12 Sep 2020 || 60 || align=left | Disc.: Spacewatch || 
|- id="2001 DM114" bgcolor=#E9E9E9
| 0 ||  || MBA-M || 16.44 || 2.2 km || multiple || 1999–2022 || 06 Jan 2022 || 267 || align=left | Disc.: LINEARAlt.: 1999 TD186, 2010 KD82 || 
|- id="2001 DN114" bgcolor=#E9E9E9
| 1 ||  || MBA-M || 17.6 || data-sort-value="0.90" | 900 m || multiple || 2001–2021 || 11 Jan 2021 || 124 || align=left | Disc.: SDSS || 
|- id="2001 DO114" bgcolor=#d6d6d6
| 0 ||  || MBA-O || 16.5 || 2.8 km || multiple || 2001–2018 || 07 Mar 2018 || 51 || align=left | Disc.: SDSS || 
|- id="2001 DP114" bgcolor=#d6d6d6
| 0 ||  || MBA-O || 16.7 || 2.5 km || multiple || 2001–2020 || 20 Sep 2020 || 53 || align=left | Disc.: SDSS || 
|- id="2001 DR114" bgcolor=#E9E9E9
| 0 ||  || MBA-M || 17.6 || 1.3 km || multiple || 2001–2020 || 20 Oct 2020 || 52 || align=left | Disc.: Spacewatch || 
|- id="2001 DS114" bgcolor=#d6d6d6
| 0 ||  || MBA-O || 16.8 || 2.4 km || multiple || 2001–2020 || 20 Dec 2020 || 91 || align=left | Disc.: SDSS || 
|- id="2001 DT114" bgcolor=#fefefe
| 0 ||  || MBA-I || 18.9 || data-sort-value="0.49" | 490 m || multiple || 2001–2021 || 08 Jan 2021 || 71 || align=left | Disc.: SDSS || 
|- id="2001 DV114" bgcolor=#fefefe
| 0 ||  || MBA-I || 18.75 || data-sort-value="0.53" | 530 m || multiple || 2001–2021 || 12 Sep 2021 || 55 || align=left | Disc.: Spacewatch || 
|- id="2001 DW114" bgcolor=#d6d6d6
| 0 ||  || MBA-O || 16.46 || 2.8 km || multiple || 1993–2021 || 26 Oct 2021 || 100 || align=left | Disc.: SDSS || 
|- id="2001 DX114" bgcolor=#d6d6d6
| 0 ||  || MBA-O || 16.79 || 2.4 km || multiple || 2001–2022 || 24 Jan 2022 || 95 || align=left | Disc.: Mauna Kea Obs. || 
|- id="2001 DY114" bgcolor=#fefefe
| 0 ||  || MBA-I || 18.7 || data-sort-value="0.54" | 540 m || multiple || 2001–2018 || 14 Aug 2018 || 47 || align=left | Disc.: SDSS || 
|- id="2001 DA115" bgcolor=#d6d6d6
| 0 ||  || MBA-O || 16.74 || 2.5 km || multiple || 2001–2021 || 11 Oct 2021 || 111 || align=left | Disc.: SDSS || 
|- id="2001 DB115" bgcolor=#d6d6d6
| 0 ||  || MBA-O || 16.77 || 2.5 km || multiple || 2001–2021 || 23 Oct 2021 || 60 || align=left | Disc.: SDSS || 
|- id="2001 DC115" bgcolor=#E9E9E9
| 0 ||  || MBA-M || 17.82 || 1.1 km || multiple || 2001–2022 || 27 Jan 2022 || 58 || align=left | Disc.: SDSS || 
|- id="2001 DD115" bgcolor=#fefefe
| 0 ||  || MBA-I || 18.95 || data-sort-value="0.48" | 480 m || multiple || 2001–2021 || 04 Aug 2021 || 48 || align=left | Disc.: SDSS || 
|- id="2001 DF115" bgcolor=#d6d6d6
| 0 ||  || MBA-O || 16.7 || 2.5 km || multiple || 2001–2019 || 24 Dec 2019 || 75 || align=left | Disc.: SDSS || 
|- id="2001 DG115" bgcolor=#fefefe
| 0 ||  || MBA-I || 18.37 || data-sort-value="0.63" | 630 m || multiple || 2001–2021 || 01 Nov 2021 || 99 || align=left | Disc.: SDSS || 
|- id="2001 DJ115" bgcolor=#fefefe
| 0 ||  || MBA-I || 18.6 || data-sort-value="0.57" | 570 m || multiple || 2001–2020 || 23 Oct 2020 || 63 || align=left | Disc.: SDSS || 
|- id="2001 DL115" bgcolor=#fefefe
| 1 ||  || HUN || 18.7 || data-sort-value="0.54" | 540 m || multiple || 2001–2018 || 29 Sep 2018 || 46 || align=left | Disc.: Spacewatch || 
|- id="2001 DN115" bgcolor=#d6d6d6
| 0 ||  || MBA-O || 16.7 || 2.5 km || multiple || 2001–2019 || 01 Nov 2019 || 71 || align=left | Disc.: SDSS || 
|- id="2001 DO115" bgcolor=#d6d6d6
| 0 ||  || MBA-O || 16.7 || 2.5 km || multiple || 2001–2019 || 28 Nov 2019 || 63 || align=left | Disc.: SpacewatchAlt.: 2017 EL17 || 
|- id="2001 DP115" bgcolor=#fefefe
| 0 ||  || MBA-I || 17.9 || data-sort-value="0.78" | 780 m || multiple || 2001–2018 || 17 Jan 2018 || 40 || align=left | Disc.: SDSS || 
|- id="2001 DQ115" bgcolor=#d6d6d6
| 0 ||  || MBA-O || 16.7 || 2.5 km || multiple || 2001–2019 || 01 Oct 2019 || 54 || align=left | Disc.: SDSS || 
|- id="2001 DT115" bgcolor=#d6d6d6
| 1 ||  || MBA-O || 17.0 || 2.2 km || multiple || 2001–2019 || 29 Sep 2019 || 45 || align=left | Disc.: SDSS || 
|- id="2001 DU115" bgcolor=#fefefe
| 0 ||  || MBA-I || 18.5 || data-sort-value="0.59" | 590 m || multiple || 2001–2020 || 24 Jun 2020 || 96 || align=left | Disc.: SDSS || 
|- id="2001 DW115" bgcolor=#E9E9E9
| 0 ||  || MBA-M || 17.7 || 1.2 km || multiple || 2001–2019 || 21 Aug 2019 || 39 || align=left | Disc.: SDSS || 
|- id="2001 DX115" bgcolor=#fefefe
| 0 ||  || MBA-I || 18.5 || data-sort-value="0.59" | 590 m || multiple || 2001–2017 || 17 Sep 2017 || 35 || align=left | Disc.: Spacewatch || 
|- id="2001 DY115" bgcolor=#E9E9E9
| 0 ||  || MBA-M || 17.3 || 1.0 km || multiple || 2001–2021 || 15 Jan 2021 || 119 || align=left | Disc.: AMOS || 
|- id="2001 DC116" bgcolor=#fefefe
| 1 ||  || MBA-I || 19.0 || data-sort-value="0.47" | 470 m || multiple || 2001–2018 || 07 Mar 2018 || 33 || align=left | Disc.: Spacewatch || 
|- id="2001 DE116" bgcolor=#E9E9E9
| 0 ||  || MBA-M || 17.3 || 1.0 km || multiple || 2001–2019 || 27 Oct 2019 || 62 || align=left | Disc.: SDSS || 
|- id="2001 DF116" bgcolor=#fefefe
| 0 ||  || MBA-I || 18.7 || data-sort-value="0.54" | 540 m || multiple || 2001–2020 || 10 Aug 2020 || 34 || align=left | Disc.: SDSS || 
|- id="2001 DG116" bgcolor=#d6d6d6
| 0 ||  || MBA-O || 16.84 || 2.4 km || multiple || 2001–2021 || 10 Nov 2021 || 94 || align=left | Disc.: SDSSAlt.: 2010 OA41 || 
|- id="2001 DH116" bgcolor=#d6d6d6
| 0 ||  || MBA-O || 17.2 || 2.0 km || multiple || 2001–2019 || 04 Jul 2019 || 40 || align=left | Disc.: SDSS || 
|- id="2001 DK116" bgcolor=#fefefe
| 1 ||  || MBA-I || 18.4 || data-sort-value="0.62" | 620 m || multiple || 2001–2020 || 25 Jan 2020 || 30 || align=left | Disc.: SDSS || 
|- id="2001 DM116" bgcolor=#E9E9E9
| 0 ||  || MBA-M || 17.5 || 1.3 km || multiple || 2001–2020 || 16 Sep 2020 || 43 || align=left | Disc.: SDSS || 
|- id="2001 DO116" bgcolor=#fefefe
| 0 ||  || MBA-I || 18.7 || data-sort-value="0.54" | 540 m || multiple || 2001–2019 || 26 Sep 2019 || 40 || align=left | Disc.: SDSS || 
|- id="2001 DP116" bgcolor=#fefefe
| 1 ||  || MBA-I || 18.9 || data-sort-value="0.49" | 490 m || multiple || 2001–2016 || 09 May 2016 || 28 || align=left | Disc.: SDSS || 
|- id="2001 DQ116" bgcolor=#E9E9E9
| 0 ||  || MBA-M || 16.6 || 1.4 km || multiple || 2001–2020 || 25 Jan 2020 || 92 || align=left | Disc.: SDSS || 
|- id="2001 DR116" bgcolor=#E9E9E9
| 1 ||  || MBA-M || 18.2 || data-sort-value="0.96" | 960 m || multiple || 2001–2014 || 20 Mar 2014 || 16 || align=left | Disc.: SDSS || 
|- id="2001 DS116" bgcolor=#d6d6d6
| 0 ||  || MBA-O || 16.6 || 2.7 km || multiple || 2001–2019 || 27 Oct 2019 || 84 || align=left | Disc.: SDSSAlt.: 2010 AV114 || 
|- id="2001 DT116" bgcolor=#fefefe
| 0 ||  || MBA-I || 18.5 || data-sort-value="0.59" | 590 m || multiple || 2001–2020 || 26 Sep 2020 || 73 || align=left | Disc.: Spacewatch || 
|- id="2001 DU116" bgcolor=#d6d6d6
| 0 ||  || MBA-O || 16.43 || 2.9 km || multiple || 2001–2021 || 30 Nov 2021 || 163 || align=left | Disc.: SDSS || 
|- id="2001 DW116" bgcolor=#fefefe
| 0 ||  || MBA-I || 17.63 || data-sort-value="0.89" | 890 m || multiple || 2001–2021 || 28 Nov 2021 || 140 || align=left | Disc.: SDSSAlt.: 2010 OB149 || 
|- id="2001 DX116" bgcolor=#fefefe
| 0 ||  || MBA-I || 18.33 || data-sort-value="0.64" | 640 m || multiple || 2001–2021 || 09 May 2021 || 88 || align=left | Disc.: Cerro Tololo || 
|- id="2001 DA117" bgcolor=#d6d6d6
| 0 ||  || MBA-O || 15.3 || 4.8 km || multiple || 2001–2021 || 17 Jan 2021 || 103 || align=left | Disc.: SDSSAlt.: 2010 DM100 || 
|- id="2001 DB117" bgcolor=#d6d6d6
| 0 ||  || MBA-O || 16.65 || 2.6 km || multiple || 2001–2021 || 07 Nov 2021 || 88 || align=left | Disc.: SDSS || 
|- id="2001 DC117" bgcolor=#E9E9E9
| 0 ||  || MBA-M || 17.0 || 1.7 km || multiple || 2001–2020 || 05 Nov 2020 || 96 || align=left | Disc.: SDSS || 
|- id="2001 DD117" bgcolor=#fefefe
| 0 ||  || MBA-I || 18.4 || data-sort-value="0.62" | 620 m || multiple || 2001–2019 || 27 May 2019 || 59 || align=left | Disc.: SDSS || 
|- id="2001 DE117" bgcolor=#E9E9E9
| 0 ||  || MBA-M || 17.5 || 1.8 km || multiple || 2001–2020 || 15 May 2020 || 59 || align=left | Disc.: SDSS || 
|- id="2001 DL117" bgcolor=#d6d6d6
| 0 ||  || MBA-O || 16.9 || 2.3 km || multiple || 2001–2019 || 06 Sep 2019 || 49 || align=left | Disc.: SDSS || 
|- id="2001 DN117" bgcolor=#E9E9E9
| 0 ||  || MBA-M || 17.98 || 1.1 km || multiple || 2001–2021 || 01 Dec 2021 || 58 || align=left | Disc.: Spacewatch || 
|- id="2001 DP117" bgcolor=#fefefe
| 0 ||  || MBA-I || 17.9 || data-sort-value="0.78" | 780 m || multiple || 2001–2019 || 08 Jan 2019 || 47 || align=left | Disc.: SDSS || 
|- id="2001 DQ117" bgcolor=#E9E9E9
| 0 ||  || MBA-M || 17.2 || 1.1 km || multiple || 2001–2021 || 15 Jan 2021 || 66 || align=left | Disc.: SDSS || 
|- id="2001 DR117" bgcolor=#d6d6d6
| 0 ||  || MBA-O || 16.9 || 2.3 km || multiple || 1996–2019 || 23 Oct 2019 || 67 || align=left | Disc.: Spacewatch || 
|- id="2001 DU117" bgcolor=#fefefe
| 0 ||  || MBA-I || 18.42 || data-sort-value="0.62" | 620 m || multiple || 2001–2019 || 29 Jun 2019 || 47 || align=left | Disc.: SDSS || 
|- id="2001 DV117" bgcolor=#d6d6d6
| 0 ||  || MBA-O || 16.86 || 2.4 km || multiple || 2001–2021 || 31 Oct 2021 || 58 || align=left | Disc.: Spacewatch || 
|- id="2001 DW117" bgcolor=#d6d6d6
| 0 ||  || MBA-O || 16.6 || 2.7 km || multiple || 2001–2021 || 16 Jan 2021 || 60 || align=left | Disc.: SDSSAlt.: 2010 BS41 || 
|- id="2001 DX117" bgcolor=#E9E9E9
| 0 ||  || MBA-M || 17.1 || 2.1 km || multiple || 2001–2019 || 04 Jan 2019 || 37 || align=left | Disc.: SDSS || 
|- id="2001 DZ117" bgcolor=#fefefe
| 0 ||  || MBA-I || 18.52 || data-sort-value="0.59" | 590 m || multiple || 2001–2021 || 09 Dec 2021 || 53 || align=left | Disc.: SDSS || 
|- id="2001 DA118" bgcolor=#d6d6d6
| 0 ||  || MBA-O || 16.98 || 2.2 km || multiple || 2001–2022 || 27 Jan 2022 || 43 || align=left | Disc.: SDSS || 
|- id="2001 DB118" bgcolor=#E9E9E9
| 0 ||  || MBA-M || 17.7 || 1.2 km || multiple || 2001–2019 || 06 Sep 2019 || 36 || align=left | Disc.: SDSS || 
|- id="2001 DC118" bgcolor=#E9E9E9
| 1 ||  || MBA-M || 17.7 || 1.6 km || multiple || 2001–2019 || 11 Feb 2019 || 34 || align=left | Disc.: SDSS || 
|- id="2001 DD118" bgcolor=#E9E9E9
| 0 ||  || MBA-M || 17.6 || data-sort-value="0.90" | 900 m || multiple || 1993–2019 || 28 Oct 2019 || 35 || align=left | Disc.: SDSS || 
|- id="2001 DE118" bgcolor=#E9E9E9
| 0 ||  || MBA-M || 17.4 || 1.8 km || multiple || 2001–2020 || 16 May 2020 || 47 || align=left | Disc.: SDSS || 
|- id="2001 DF118" bgcolor=#d6d6d6
| 0 ||  || MBA-O || 16.6 || 2.7 km || multiple || 2001–2020 || 22 Nov 2020 || 174 || align=left | Disc.: SDSS || 
|- id="2001 DG118" bgcolor=#d6d6d6
| 0 ||  || MBA-O || 16.61 || 2.7 km || multiple || 2001–2021 || 24 Nov 2021 || 115 || align=left | Disc.: SDSS || 
|- id="2001 DH118" bgcolor=#fefefe
| 0 ||  || MBA-I || 18.58 || data-sort-value="0.57" | 570 m || multiple || 2001–2021 || 31 Mar 2021 || 95 || align=left | Disc.: La Palma Obs. || 
|- id="2001 DK118" bgcolor=#fefefe
| 0 ||  || MBA-I || 18.4 || data-sort-value="0.62" | 620 m || multiple || 2001–2020 || 12 Nov 2020 || 72 || align=left | Disc.: SDSS || 
|- id="2001 DN118" bgcolor=#E9E9E9
| 0 ||  || MBA-M || 17.3 || 1.0 km || multiple || 2001–2019 || 22 Sep 2019 || 57 || align=left | Disc.: SDSS || 
|- id="2001 DO118" bgcolor=#E9E9E9
| 0 ||  || MBA-M || 17.1 || 1.1 km || multiple || 2001–2021 || 17 Jan 2021 || 71 || align=left | Disc.: SDSSAlt.: 2010 FR132 || 
|- id="2001 DP118" bgcolor=#d6d6d6
| 0 ||  || MBA-O || 16.9 || 2.3 km || multiple || 1996–2019 || 06 Aug 2019 || 63 || align=left | Disc.: SpacewatchAlt.: 1996 GT7 || 
|- id="2001 DS118" bgcolor=#fefefe
| 0 ||  || MBA-I || 18.76 || data-sort-value="0.53" | 530 m || multiple || 2001–2021 || 07 Sep 2021 || 66 || align=left | Disc.: SDSS || 
|- id="2001 DT118" bgcolor=#d6d6d6
| 0 ||  || MBA-O || 17.4 || 1.8 km || multiple || 2001–2021 || 12 Jan 2021 || 42 || align=left | Disc.: SDSS || 
|- id="2001 DU118" bgcolor=#E9E9E9
| 0 ||  || MBA-M || 17.3 || 1.0 km || multiple || 2001–2021 || 16 Jan 2021 || 47 || align=left | Disc.: SDSS || 
|- id="2001 DV118" bgcolor=#fefefe
| 0 ||  || MBA-I || 19.0 || data-sort-value="0.47" | 470 m || multiple || 2001–2019 || 24 Aug 2019 || 39 || align=left | Disc.: SDSS || 
|- id="2001 DW118" bgcolor=#E9E9E9
| 0 ||  || MBA-M || 17.9 || 1.1 km || multiple || 2001–2019 || 23 Aug 2019 || 34 || align=left | Disc.: SDSS || 
|- id="2001 DY118" bgcolor=#d6d6d6
| 0 ||  || MBA-O || 17.0 || 2.2 km || multiple || 2001–2019 || 24 Aug 2019 || 30 || align=left | Disc.: SDSS || 
|- id="2001 DZ118" bgcolor=#fefefe
| 0 ||  || MBA-I || 18.2 || data-sort-value="0.68" | 680 m || multiple || 2001–2021 || 16 Jan 2021 || 70 || align=left | Disc.: SDSS || 
|- id="2001 DA119" bgcolor=#fefefe
| 0 ||  || MBA-I || 18.78 || data-sort-value="0.52" | 520 m || multiple || 2001–2021 || 01 Nov 2021 || 37 || align=left | Disc.: SDSS || 
|- id="2001 DB119" bgcolor=#E9E9E9
| 0 ||  || MBA-M || 17.9 || 1.5 km || multiple || 2001–2019 || 05 Feb 2019 || 28 || align=left | Disc.: SDSS || 
|- id="2001 DC119" bgcolor=#fefefe
| 0 ||  || MBA-I || 18.5 || data-sort-value="0.59" | 590 m || multiple || 2001–2019 || 08 Feb 2019 || 30 || align=left | Disc.: SDSS || 
|- id="2001 DD119" bgcolor=#d6d6d6
| 0 ||  || MBA-O || 17.14 || 2.1 km || multiple || 2001–2021 || 12 Aug 2021 || 31 || align=left | Disc.: SDSS || 
|- id="2001 DE119" bgcolor=#E9E9E9
| 0 ||  || MBA-M || 18.08 || 1.0 km || multiple || 2001–2022 || 27 Jan 2022 || 35 || align=left | Disc.: SDSS || 
|- id="2001 DF119" bgcolor=#d6d6d6
| 0 ||  || MBA-O || 16.44 || 2.9 km || multiple || 2001–2021 || 17 Apr 2021 || 85 || align=left | Disc.: La Palma Obs. || 
|- id="2001 DG119" bgcolor=#d6d6d6
| 0 ||  || MBA-O || 16.96 || 2.3 km || multiple || 2001–2022 || 26 Jan 2022 || 77 || align=left | Disc.: SDSS || 
|- id="2001 DJ119" bgcolor=#d6d6d6
| 0 ||  || MBA-O || 16.7 || 2.5 km || multiple || 2001–2020 || 12 Dec 2020 || 82 || align=left | Disc.: Spacewatch || 
|- id="2001 DK119" bgcolor=#fefefe
| 0 ||  || MBA-I || 18.91 || data-sort-value="0.49" | 490 m || multiple || 2001–2021 || 09 Apr 2021 || 59 || align=left | Disc.: SDSS || 
|- id="2001 DN119" bgcolor=#E9E9E9
| 1 ||  || MBA-M || 17.3 || 1.0 km || multiple || 2001–2021 || 16 Jan 2021 || 66 || align=left | Disc.: AMOS || 
|- id="2001 DR119" bgcolor=#d6d6d6
| 0 ||  || MBA-O || 17.28 || 1.9 km || multiple || 1998–2022 || 25 Jan 2022 || 56 || align=left | Disc.: SDSS || 
|- id="2001 DS119" bgcolor=#d6d6d6
| 0 ||  || MBA-O || 17.2 || 2.0 km || multiple || 2001–2021 || 04 Jan 2021 || 37 || align=left | Disc.: SDSS || 
|- id="2001 DT119" bgcolor=#d6d6d6
| 0 ||  || MBA-O || 16.7 || 2.5 km || multiple || 2001–2020 || 11 Aug 2020 || 38 || align=left | Disc.: SDSS || 
|- id="2001 DU119" bgcolor=#d6d6d6
| 0 ||  || MBA-O || 17.33 || 1.9 km || multiple || 2001–2021 || 25 Nov 2021 || 62 || align=left | Disc.: Spacewatch || 
|- id="2001 DV119" bgcolor=#d6d6d6
| 0 ||  || MBA-O || 17.03 || 2.2 km || multiple || 2001–2021 || 03 May 2021 || 89 || align=left | Disc.: SDSS || 
|- id="2001 DX119" bgcolor=#d6d6d6
| 0 ||  || MBA-O || 17.64 || 1.7 km || multiple || 2001–2021 || 17 Apr 2021 || 52 || align=left | Disc.: SDSS || 
|- id="2001 DA120" bgcolor=#fefefe
| 0 ||  || MBA-I || 18.9 || data-sort-value="0.49" | 490 m || multiple || 2001–2018 || 13 Dec 2018 || 38 || align=left | Disc.: SDSS || 
|- id="2001 DB120" bgcolor=#fefefe
| 0 ||  || MBA-I || 18.58 || data-sort-value="0.57" | 570 m || multiple || 2001–2021 || 09 Apr 2021 || 79 || align=left | Disc.: Spacewatch || 
|- id="2001 DC120" bgcolor=#E9E9E9
| 0 ||  || MBA-M || 17.8 || 1.2 km || multiple || 2001–2020 || 15 Oct 2020 || 46 || align=left | Disc.: SDSS || 
|- id="2001 DD120" bgcolor=#C2FFFF
| 0 ||  || JT || 14.84 || 6.0 km || multiple || 2001–2021 || 30 Nov 2021 || 55 || align=left | Disc.: SDSSGreek camp (L4) || 
|- id="2001 DE120" bgcolor=#d6d6d6
| 0 ||  || MBA-O || 16.69 || 2.6 km || multiple || 2001–2021 || 31 Oct 2021 || 48 || align=left | Disc.: SDSS || 
|- id="2001 DF120" bgcolor=#fefefe
| 0 ||  || MBA-I || 19.0 || data-sort-value="0.47" | 470 m || multiple || 2001–2018 || 20 Feb 2018 || 54 || align=left | Disc.: SDSS || 
|- id="2001 DG120" bgcolor=#E9E9E9
| 0 ||  || MBA-M || 18.02 || data-sort-value="0.74" | 740 m || multiple || 2001–2022 || 27 Jan 2022 || 56 || align=left | Disc.: SDSS || 
|- id="2001 DH120" bgcolor=#fefefe
| 0 ||  || MBA-I || 18.4 || data-sort-value="0.62" | 620 m || multiple || 2001–2020 || 17 Sep 2020 || 34 || align=left | Disc.: SDSS || 
|- id="2001 DJ120" bgcolor=#E9E9E9
| 0 ||  || MBA-M || 17.7 || 1.2 km || multiple || 2001–2019 || 27 Sep 2019 || 28 || align=left | Disc.: SDSS || 
|- id="2001 DK120" bgcolor=#d6d6d6
| 1 ||  || MBA-O || 17.07 || 2.2 km || multiple || 2001–2023 || 13 Mar 2023 || 36 || align=left | Disc.: SDSSAdded on 17 January 2021 || 
|}
back to top

E 

|- id="2001 EC" bgcolor=#FFC2E0
| 0 || 2001 EC || APO || 18.66 || data-sort-value="0.66" | 660 m || multiple || 2001–2021 || 09 Sep 2021 || 533 || align=left | Disc.: LINEARPotentially hazardous object || 
|- id="2001 EV7" bgcolor=#d6d6d6
| 3 ||  || MBA-O || 17.6 || 1.7 km || multiple || 2001–2017 || 20 Mar 2017 || 23 || align=left | Disc.: LONEOSAdded on 24 December 2021 || 
|- id="2001 EJ8" bgcolor=#fefefe
| 0 ||  || MBA-I || 17.83 || data-sort-value="0.81" | 810 m || multiple || 2001–2021 || 02 Apr 2021 || 312 || align=left | Disc.: LONEOSAlt.: 2011 CX73 || 
|- id="2001 EC16" bgcolor=#FFC2E0
| 0 ||  || APO || 22.3 || data-sort-value="0.12" | 120 m || multiple || 2001–2015 || 18 Sep 2015 || 188 || align=left | Disc.: AMOS || 
|- id="2001 ED18" bgcolor=#FFC2E0
| 5 ||  || ATE || 24.5 || data-sort-value="0.045" | 45 m || single || 5 days || 20 Mar 2001 || 94 || align=left | Disc.: LINEAR || 
|- id="2001 EC19" bgcolor=#E9E9E9
| 0 ||  || MBA-M || 16.8 || 1.3 km || multiple || 2001–2019 || 29 Oct 2019 || 138 || align=left | Disc.: SpacewatchAlt.: 2006 QG91, 2010 GL185 || 
|- id="2001 ES24" bgcolor=#C2E0FF
| 3 ||  || TNO || 7.4 || 110 km || multiple || 2001–2020 || 18 Feb 2020 || 22 || align=left | Disc.: La Silla Obs.LoUTNOs, cubewano (cold) || 
|- id="2001 EX27" bgcolor=#E9E9E9
| 0 ||  || MBA-M || 17.5 || 1.3 km || multiple || 2001–2020 || 08 Dec 2020 || 124 || align=left | Disc.: Spacewatch || 
|- id="2001 EY27" bgcolor=#d6d6d6
| 0 ||  || MBA-O || 16.30 || 3.1 km || multiple || 2001–2021 || 11 Nov 2021 || 109 || align=left | Disc.: Spacewatch || 
|- id="2001 EZ27" bgcolor=#fefefe
| 0 ||  || MBA-I || 18.0 || data-sort-value="0.75" | 750 m || multiple || 2001–2018 || 15 Jan 2018 || 59 || align=left | Disc.: Spacewatch || 
|- id="2001 EA28" bgcolor=#fefefe
| 0 ||  || MBA-I || 18.52 || data-sort-value="0.59" | 590 m || multiple || 2001–2021 || 10 Sep 2021 || 50 || align=left | Disc.: Spacewatch || 
|- id="2001 EC28" bgcolor=#fefefe
| 1 ||  || HUN || 19.1 || data-sort-value="0.45" | 450 m || multiple || 2001–2020 || 28 Apr 2020 || 37 || align=left | Disc.: SpacewatchAdded on 22 July 2020 || 
|}
back to top

References 
 

Lists of unnumbered minor planets